Andrew Lawrie (born 24 November 1978) is a Scottish former footballer, who played as a defender.

Lawrie joined St. Johnstone in June 2006, signing a three-year contract. He scored his first goal for St. Johnstone in a 3-2 defeat at Livingston on 13 January 2007.

Honours
Falkirk

Scottish Division One champions: 2002–03, 2004–05

References

External links

1978 births
Living people
People from Galashiels
Association football defenders
Scottish footballers
Falkirk F.C. players
East Fife F.C. players
St Johnstone F.C. players
Stirling Albion F.C. players
Scottish Football League players
Scottish Premier League players
Sportspeople from the Scottish Borders